Koldo Fernández de Larrea (born 13 September 1981) is a Spanish former professional road racing cyclist, who rode professionally between 2004 and 2014 for the  and  teams. He now works as a transfer agent within the sport.

Born in Vitoria-Gasteiz, Basque Country, Fernández currently resides in Zurbano, Basque Country, Spain.

Major results
Sources:

1999
 1st  Road race, National Junior Road Championships
2006
 5th Trofeo Mallorca
 10th Grand Prix Pino Cerami
2007
 1st Stage 7 Tirreno–Adriatico
 Vuelta a Mallorca
4th Trofeo Mallorca
6th Trofeo Calvia
 5th Overall Vuelta a Andalucía
2008
 1st Tour de Vendée
 Vuelta a Murcia
1st  Points classification
1st Stage 5
 1st Stage 5 Vuelta a Castilla y León
 1st Stage 2 Euskal Bizikleta
 1st Stage 3 Vuelta a Burgos
 2nd Circuito de Getxo
 4th Clásica de Almería
 4th Gran Premio de Llodio
2009
 1st Circuito de Getxo
 1st Stage 1 Vuelta a Burgos
 1st Stage 2 Volta ao Algarve
 5th Trofeo Cala Millor
 5th Vattenfall Cyclassics
 6th Gent–Wevelgem
2010
 1st Tour de Vendée
 1st Stage 1 Vuelta a Burgos
 2nd Overall Tour de Picardie
 Vuelta a Mallorca
2nd Trofeo Palma de Mallorca
2nd Trofeo Magaluf-Palmanova
5th Trofeo Cala Millor
 3rd Road race, National Road Championships
 9th Circuito de Getxo
2011
 2nd Road race, National Road Championships
 8th Trofeo Magaluf-Palmanova
2012
 2nd Road race, National Road Championships

Grand Tour general classification results timeline

References

External links

  

Cycling Base: Koldo Fernández
Cycling Quotient: Koldo Fernández
Garmin-Sharp: Koldo Fernández

Cyclists from the Basque Country (autonomous community)
Spanish male cyclists
1981 births
Living people
Sportspeople from Vitoria-Gasteiz